The 2003 NCAA Division I baseball season, play of college baseball in the United States organized by the National Collegiate Athletic Association (NCAA) at the Division I level, began on January 16, 2003.  The season progressed through the regular season, many conference tournaments and championship series, and concluded with the 2003 NCAA Division I baseball tournament and 2003 College World Series.  The College World Series, which consisted of the eight remaining teams in the NCAA tournament, was held in its annual location of Omaha, Nebraska, at Rosenblatt Stadium.  It concluded on June 23, 2003, with the final game of the best-of-three championship series, the first such championship series used at the College World Series.  Rice defeated Stanford two games to one to claim its first championship.

Realignment

New programs
Three programs joined Division I prior to the 2003 season– Gardner-Webb, which had been a provisional member; Savannah State, which had been a Division II independent; and IPFW, which had been a provisional member.

Dropped programs
Howard dropped its baseball program following the 2002 season.

Conference changes
Sacramento State, which had been a member of the Big West Conference, became a Division I independent.

Conference formats
Bowling Green, which had played in the East Division of the Mid-American Conference, moved to the West Division.

Conference standings

College World Series

The 2003 season marked the fifty seventh NCAA Baseball Tournament, which culminated with the eight team College World Series.  The College World Series was held in Omaha, Nebraska.  The eight teams played a double-elimination format, with Rice claiming their first championship with a two games to one series win over Stanford in the final.

Bracket

Award winners

All-America team

References

2003 Division I Standings at BoydsWorld.com